The Master of Andlau is the notname given to an Alsatian Romanesque sculptor and his workshop, active in the middle of the 12th century.

The Master's name derives from the relief sculptures of the main portal and the frieze around Andlau Abbey church. Fragments of other works by the Master are housed in the Musée de l’Œuvre Notre-Dame in Strasbourg and in the Unterlinden Museum in Colmar.

Gallery

References

See also 
Master of Eschau

People from Bas-Rhin
12th-century sculptors
Medieval German sculptors